The state of Oklahoma historically had civil townships. On August 5, 1913, voters passed the Oklahoma Township Amendment, also known as State Question 58. This allowed the creation or abolishment of townships on a county by county basis; by the mid-1930s, all Oklahoma counties had voted to abolish them. These civil township boundaries (and their names) were still used by the United States Census for counting purposes up to and including the 1960 census.

This list is exhaustive and does include some townships that were renamed or removed.

See also
List of counties in Oklahoma
List of municipalities in Oklahoma

References

Townships
Oklahoma